The Springfield WolfPack were an indoor football team based in Springfield, Missouri. The team played in the American Professional Football League (APFL). They folded along with the league in 2012. Home games were played at Mediacom Ice Park in Springfield, Missouri.

Springfield WolfPack Season 2012 Schedule

External links
Home Page
Radio Coverage

American Professional Football League teams
Sports in Springfield, Missouri
American football teams established in 2002
American football teams disestablished in 2012
2002 establishments in Missouri
2012 disestablishments in Missouri